Sepiolina petasus is a species of bobtail squid in the genus Sepiolina in the subfamily Heteroteuthidinae of the family
Sepiolidae. It was originally collected in the Pacific Ocean near the Okinawa Islands. It was found to be sympatric with Sepiolina nipponensis but differs from that species by its relatively elongated posterior mantle, leading to more anteriorly situated fins.

References

Bobtail squid
Molluscs described in 2011